The National Stadium of East Timor, also known as the Municipal Stadium of Dili, is a multi-purpose stadium in Dili, East Timor.

The stadium has a capacity of 5,000 and is used mostly for football matches.

History

In 1999-2000, during the 1999 East Timorese crisis and its aftermath, the stadium was used as a makeshift refugee camp and emergency relief distribution point.

On 21 December 1999, the stadium hosted the Tour of Duty – Concert for the Troops, featuring Kylie Minogue and John Farnham, for the Australian troops serving with the International Force for East Timor (INTERFET).

Since 2004, the stadium has been home to the finals of the Super Liga Timorense, the Taça Digicel, and, more recently, the Taça 12 de Novembro and the Liga Futebol Amadora / Timor-Leste.

In 2005, world-renowned soccer player Cristiano Ronaldo visited Dili stadium and had a picture with the President, Xanana Gusmão.

In 2006, the stadium once again housed a refugee camp, for over 1,000 displaced people.

A tournament held between East Timorese national teams, a UN Police team and Australian and New Zealand combined teams was held in May 2007.

On 12 March 2015, the stadium hosted the first international home match of the Timor-Leste national football team in the first round 2018 FIFA World Cup qualification against Mongolia with Timor winning 4–1.

On 20 September 2019, to commemorate the 20th anniversary of the formation of INTERFET task force, friendly football matches were played at the stadium between teams of Falintil and Interfet veterans, and between the Timor-Leste national team and an Australian Defence Force team.

Facilities 
The stadium has a capacity of 5,000 people. During the 2010s, it was renovated in two separate projects, commenced in 2011 and 2016, respectively. The 2011 renovations were inaugurated in April 2012 by the then Prime Minister of East Timor, Xanana Gusmão.

As of mid-2019, those renovations had not yet been completed.

The stadium has an athletics track, which has been used for training for the Summer Olympic Games. There are two grandstands on the Eastern and Western sides of the field. The main grandstand has a roof.

Due to problems with the stadium's infrastructure, the national football team must sometimes play its home games in other countries.

Major matches

References

External links

Football venues in East Timor
Athletics (track and field) venues in East Timor
Sport in Dili
Buildings and structures in Dili
East Timor
Multi-purpose stadiums